Tagu is the first month of the traditional Burmese calendar.

Holidays and observances
Thingyan
Pagoda festivals
Shwemawdaw Pagoda Festival, Bago

Tagu symbols
Flower: Mesua ferrea
Astrological sign: Aries

References

See also
Burmese calendar
Festivals of Burma

Months of the Burmese calendar